Harbourfront is a neighbourhood on the northern shore of Lake Ontario within the downtown core of the city of Toronto, Ontario, Canada. Part of the Toronto waterfront, Harbourfront extends from Bathurst Street in the west, along Queens Quay, with its ill-defined eastern boundary being either Yonge Street or York Street. Its northern boundary is the Gardiner Expressway. Much of the district was former water lots filled in during the early 1900s to create a larger harbour district. After shipping patterns changed and the use of the Toronto harbour declined, the area was converted from industrial uses to a mixed-use district that is mostly residential and leisure.

History

Toronto's harbour has been used since the founding of Toronto for shipping and industrial purposes. The Town of York was founded to the west of the Don River, along the waterfront. When the town was founded, the water's edge was approximately where today's 'Front Street' is located. Over time, the area south of Front Street to today's water's edge south of 'Queen's Quay' was filled in with landfill, creating piers and area for industrial development.

Prior to the 1972 federal election, Canadian Prime Minister Pierre Elliot Trudeau announced the Harbourfront project, which would expropriate the industrial port lands from York Street west to Bathurst Street, south of Queen's Quay and convert them to a cultural and residential district for Toronto, similar to the Granville Island district in Vancouver. The federal government has converted the industrial area to an area mixed with art galleries, performance spaces, boating areas and parks. The surrounding neighbourhood, formerly industrial has been converted by private land developers into a series of condominium towers overlooking the project and Lake Ontario.

From its beginnings as "Harbourfront Corporation", a federal Crown Corporation established in 1972, Harbourfront Centre was formed on January 1, 1991 as a non-profit charitable organization with a mandate to organize and present public events and to operate a  site encompassing York Quay and John Quay (south of Queens Quay West).
Since its inception, Harbourfront Centre has been used by artists that would not normally be seen in commercial venues, in an effort to foster new forms of arts and expression.

In July 2012 Waterfront Toronto began a major reconstruction of Queen's Quay West, requiring the 509 streetcar to be replaced with buses for the duration of the construction. On October 12, 2014, streetcar service resumed on 509 Harbourfront route after an absence of over two years in order to rebuild the street to a new design. With the new street design, two auto lanes south of the streetcar tracks were eliminated between Spadina Avenue and York Street in order to extend Harbourfront parkland to the edge of the streetcar tracks. The Martin Goodman Trail (a bicycle path), two rows of trees, benches and a wider pedestrian space are located on the immediate south side of the streetcar tracks.

Character

The area along the waterfront is composed of mixed uses. The federal government lands to the south of Queen's Quay include a community centre, a Toronto fire department station, various boating uses, parkland and the Harbourfront Centre. To the north of Queen's Quay, all of the industrial lands along the street have been replaced with high-rise condominium towers. To the east of the federal government lands, the waterfront is mixed with industrial uses, a hotel, ferry docks, boating uses, a sugar factory and vacant lands.

Neighbourhood issues
The neighbourhood is separated from the rest of downtown Toronto by the elevated Gardiner Expressway. A project to link Lower Simcoe with Simcoe St. via tunnel has been completed to provide a new link between Harbourfront and downtown, though access between the waterfront and the core remains an issue. Proposals have been made to demolish the Expressway in the area. One proposal was to demolish the highway east of Spadina Avenue. Another proposal, to demolish the highway from the Don River to Jarvis Street is being actively studied by the City of Toronto.

The Toronto Island Airport is another neighbourhood issue. The airport, located to the south-west of the neighbourhood, is opposed by local community groups and some city politicians, including Toronto's past mayor, David Miller, as an impediment to the waterfront lands redevelopment. Toronto's former mayor, Rob Ford, on the other hand, backed an expansion of the airport, as it created jobs. The airport, built in the 1930s, is utilized for regional air travel. The airport generates hundreds of noise complaints monthly to its operator, the Toronto Port Authority. The Toronto Port Authority confirmed on September 12, 2008, that Porter Airlines was fined for breaking noise curfews in its operations at the Island Airport. A study by the Port Authority is being conducted into reducing noise from Porter's takeoffs and landings.

Notable buildings and facilities

Harbourfront is the site of the Jack Layton Ferry Terminal which provides transportation services to the Toronto Islands from the foot of Bay Street.

Captain John's Harbour Boat Restaurant was also a ship moored at the Yonge Street slip and removed in 2015. Toronto Maritime Museum was relocated from Exhibition Place in 1997, but closed in 2003.

Harbourfront Centre, housing galleries and performance spaces is located at the foot of Lower Simcoe Street. Harbourfront houses four craft studios; ceramics, glass, metal and textiles. All studios began in 1974 and still operate, providing new craft artists with subsidized work spaces at the beginning of their careers. Harbourfront hosts an extensive program of arts and cultural events throughout each summer, including craft and artisan fairs, theatre and dance performances and musical concerts. A series of free concerts is staged at Harbourfront's outdoor concert stage every weekend throughout the summer and in winter there is a free open-air ice rink.

Queen's Quay Terminal, next to Harbourfront Centre, is a former warehouse converted into a mixed-use building including a shopping centre designed for high-end retailers, commercial office space, and a residential condominium development. Today, the mall houses some stores and restaurants, predominantly catering to tourists.

The Canada Malting Silos along the waterfront at the western edge of Harbourfront, are one of the last vestiges of the industrial past of the neighbourhood. The buildings were long ago abandoned by the company that built them, but a proposal for demolition was cancelled when the estimated cost for demolition rose into the millions of dollars. The site is also now considered a heritage site, and any development must conserve some aspect of the industrial past. Two proposals have been made, a Canadian music museum and a Toronto history museum have both been proposed for the site. Both proposals keep the silos, but demolish other buildings on the site. The silos are one two remaining silos in the area (see Victory Soya Mills Silos) and reminder of the past uses of the area.

To the south of the Silos, Toronto Ireland Park was inaugurated in 2004. The site has memorials to an 1878 exodus of Irish persons to Toronto.

To the east of Harbourfront, at the foot of Jarvis Street is the Redpath Sugar Refinery, which is both an active sugar refinery and a sugar production museum.

Parks and open spaces

Although Toronto has often been criticized for not having a dynamic and beautiful waterfront park, Harbourfront has a network of parks, open spaces and trails that allow residents and visitors to access the public realm. Parks and public spaces like HTO Park, the Martin Goodman Trail, the Yo-Yo Ma Music Garden, and the Waterfront WaveDecks at the foot of Spadina Avenue, Rees Street and Lower Simcoe combine to beautify the harbourfront and bring people to the water's edge.

List of parks and open spaces

 HarbourfrontWater's Edge
 HTO Park
 Ireland Park
 John Quay
 John Quay North
 Harbour Square Park
 Martin Goodman Trail / Waterfront Trail
 Maple Leaf Quay Eastformer site of Maple Leaf Mills Silos
 Maple Leaf Quay West
 Rees WaveDeck
 Simcoe WaveDeck
 Toronto Music Garden
 Spadina WaveDeck
 York Quay & Harbourfront Centre

Transportation

The area is served by streetcar links with Union, Spadina, and Bathurst subway stations. The 510 Spadina and 509 Harbourfront streetcar routes terminate at Union Station, travel underground along Bay Street, and surface through in the centre ROW lane on Queens Quay west. The streetcar route travels along Queen's Quay in a separate right-of-way, either to the CNE grounds, up to Spadina or to Bathurst, depending on day of the week and other factors.

The area is accessible from the Spadina Avenue, Yonge/Bay and Jarvis street off-ramps of the Gardiner Expressway.

Toronto Island Ferry operates from the City/Bay Street Docks at the foot of Bay Street (all ferries excluding Trillium) and Yonge Street slip (Trillium).

References

External links

 
Neighbourhoods in Toronto
Parks in Toronto
Culture of Toronto